Natalia Khlestkina (born ) is a Russian weightlifter, who competed in the 63 kg category and represented Russia at international competitions. She won the gold medal at the 2016 European Weightlifting Championships.

She was caught and sanctioned for using the forbidden substance metenolone.

At the 2017 European Weightlifting Championships, Khlestkina won a silver medal (snatch) and the gold medal in clean & jerk and overall ranking in women's 58 kg category.

Major results

References

1992 births
Living people
Russian female weightlifters
Place of birth missing (living people)
Doping cases in weightlifting
Russian sportspeople in doping cases
20th-century Russian women
21st-century Russian women